Chivas Tijuana, was a Mexican professional football club and former affiliate of Chivas, was based in the city of Tijuana, in the state of Baja California, Mexico.

History
The club was founded in 1997 and was affiliated with Chivas from the first division. The city of Tijuana wanted to have a professional soccer club after many failed attempts with clubs Inter and Tijuana Stars.

The club was acquired after the 1997 tournament when the Federacion Mexicana de Futbol put four franchises for sale, one bought by Tijuana the others by Unión de Curtidores, América, Halcones de Querétaro, Tecos de la UAG, Jaguares Colima. The club counted on 18 players from San Luis Río Colorado, Mexicali, Rosarito, San Diego and a few more who contributed young talent but was relegated to the second division.

In 1999, the club played its last year as Chivas Tijuana, after the Mexican federation decided that there could not be two clubs with the name Chivas. After the 1999 tournament the club changed its name to Nacional.

References

Football clubs in Baja California
Association football clubs established in 1997
Sports teams in Tijuana
1997 establishments in Mexico